Dennis John O'Callaghan (born July 26, 1940 in New Orleans, Louisiana) is an American virologist, immunologist, and biochemist. He is an internationally recognized expert on the molecular biology of the equine herpesviruses.

Biography
He graduated in 1962 with a B.S. in biology from Loyola University New Orleans and in 1968 with a Ph.D. in microbiology from the University of Mississippi Medical Center. His Ph.D. thesis is entitled Biochemical studies of equine abortion virus replication in L-M cells. He trained under the direction of Charles Chandler Randall (1913–2007). At the University of Alberta Medical Center in Edmonton, Canada, O'Callaghan was from 1968 to 1970 a postdoctoral research fellow and from 1970 to 1971 an assistant professor of biochemistry. In the department of microbiology of the University of Mississippi Medical Center, he was an assistant professor from 1971 to 1974, an associate professor from 1974 to 1977, and a full professor from 1977 to 1984. From 1984 until his retirement as professor emeritus in 2018, he was a professor and chair of the department of microbiology and immunology at LSU Health Sciences Center Shreveport. There he established the Center for Molecular and Tumor Virology.

O'Callaghan has served on the editorial boards of Virus Research, Virology, Recent Research Developments in Virology, and  the Journal of Virology. In the early 1990s, on behalf of Research Corporation Technologies, Inc. headquartered in Tucson, Arizona, he patented an antibody protective against EHV-1. He and Nikolaus Osterrieder contributed the chapter Equine herpesviruses (Herpesviridae) to the 1999 edition of the Encyclopedia of Virology.

He was the president of the American Society for Virology (ASV) for the academic year 2000–2001. He was elected in 2002 a fellow of the American Association for the Advancement of Science.

O'Callaghan's research on the biochemistry of herpesviruses reveals how viral regulator proteins govern the viral genome's expression. He and his colleagues have elucidated "the functional domains of viral regulatory proteins, the interactions of viral and cellular proteins, and how these interactions either up-regulate or retard viral gene expression."

In June 1967 in Jackson, Mississippi, he married Helen Frances Briscoe (1941–2018), a medical geneticist and watercolorist. They became the parents of one son and the grandparents of twin grandsons.

Selected publications

References

1940 births
Living people
American virologists
Loyola University New Orleans alumni
University of Mississippi alumni
University of Mississippi faculty
Louisiana State University faculty
Fellows of the American Association for the Advancement of Science